Kitty Jay is a music album by Seth Lakeman published in 2004. It is his second album that he published as a principal performer. It was shortlisted for the Mercury Music Prize for 2005. The songs were inspired by stories and legends from Dartmoor, where Lakeman grew up.

Track listing
"John Lomas" (traditional) – 3:52
"The Bold Knight" (Seth Lakeman) – 3:51
"Fight for Favour" (Seth Lakeman) – 4:03
"Kitty Jay" (Seth Lakeman) – 3:12
"Farewell My Love" (Seth Lakeman) – 2:22
"Blood Upon Copper" (Seth Lakeman) – 3:04
"Henry Clark" (traditional) – 3:02
"The Storm" (Seth Lakeman) – 2:41
"Cape Clear" (traditional) – 4:20
"The Ballad of Josie" (Seth Lakeman) – 3:25
"The Streamers" (traditional) – 2:43

Personnel

Seth Lakeman: vocals, tenor guitar, violin, viola
Sean Lakeman: guitar, electric bass, mandolin
Ben Nicholls: double bass
Iain Goodall: drums
Kathryn Roberts: vocals
Benji Kirkpatrick: bouzouki, vocals
Audrey Mills: church organ

References

Seth Lakeman albums
2004 albums